Deja Perkins is an American urban ecologist. She has spoken out vocally against racism in STEM fields, is a co-organizer of Black Birders Week, and is president of the BlackAFinSTEM collective. She is currently a graduate student at North Carolina State University.

Awards and honors 
In 2022, Perkins received the National Wildlife Federation's National Conservation Young Leader Award and was honored by North Carolina Governor Roy Cooper as a Black STEM Leader.

References 

Living people
American ecologists
Women ecologists
American women scientists
Year of birth missing (living people)
North Carolina State University faculty
American women academics
21st-century American women